The Indonesian Orthodox Church (GOI; Indonesian: Gereja Ortodoks Indonesia) is a diocese which has been under the jurisdiction of the Church of the Genuine Orthodox Christians of Greece since 2019. The theology and praxis of the church is essentially the same as any other Eastern Orthodox Church, though they are not in communion with the larger body of Eastern Orthodox Christians. The legal entity of the Indonesian Orthodox Church was founded and is still managed in day-to-day affairs by Daniel Bambang Dwi Byantoro, and its history is in many ways inseparable from his own.

History 

The GOI was founded in 1991 after missionary work begun in 1988 by Daniel Byantoro, who converted to Christianity from Islam in the mid-1970s and discovered Eastern Orthodoxy through bishop Kallistos Ware's book The Orthodox Church while studying at a Protestant seminary in Seoul, Korea in 1982. He was chrismated into the Orthodox Church by Archimandrite Sotirios Trambas in Korea in September 1983. In 1984 he spent some time on Mount Athos and then traveled to the US where he studied in various theological schools. He was ordained a priest by Metropolitan Maximos of Pittsburgh, under the jurisdiction of the Ecumenical Patriarch, at some point between 1985-87 before returning to Indonesia to start putting down roots for the Orthodox Church there.

In September of 1996, the Ecumenical Patriarch founded the Metropolitanate of Hong Kong and South East Asia, which became the de facto governing diocese in Indonesia. Through donations from parishes in the US and Greece, the GOI was able to construct their first permanent church building in Surakarta, a culturally important city in the heart of Java. In the period between 1996 and 2004, the GOI was under the guidance of then-Metropolitan Nikitas Loulias. There were various struggles between the Metropolitan and Byantoro in regards to canonicity, financial propriety, and handling of Church properties which led to Byantoro being defrocked by the Ecumenical Patriarch.

In 2005, Byantoro was received into ROCOR and appointed as Archimandrite by Metropolitan Hilarion. In May of 2007 ROCOR reunited with the Moscow Patriarchate after 80 years of separation following the Bolshevik revolution in Russia. In 2019, for reasons which are still unclear, but likely related to Byantoro's public wishes for the GOI to be more culturally Indonesian and more self-governing, the GOI was received into the Genuine Greek Orthodox Church, an Old Calendarist group which is not in communion with the rest of the Orthodox world. This caused a rift in the laity and clergy in Indonesia, and both the Moscow Patriarchate and the Ecumenical Patriarch founded new churches across the archipelago to receive those who were not willing to go along with the move.

Structure 
Currently, GOI consists of 9 parishes and 6 communities spread across various cities in Indonesia.

References

External links 

 Sejarah berdirinya GOI

Eastern Orthodoxy by country
Christian denominations in Indonesia
Russian Orthodox Church Outside of Russia
Eastern Orthodoxy in Indonesia